Česlovas Juršėnas (born 18 May 1938) is a Lithuanian politician and a former Speaker of the Seimas, the Lithuanian parliament.

In 1955, he graduated from Ignalina secondary school (now Ignalina Česlovas Kudaba Progymnasium) with a gold medal and entered Vilnius State University of Vincas Kapsukas, graduating in 1960.

During 1960–1964 Juršėnas was an employee of a newspaper Tiesa.

He was a signatory of the Act of the Re-Establishment of the State of Lithuania on 11 March 1990.

Juršėnas has published several books about politics and the world.

See also
 List of speakers of the Seimas

References

1938 births
Living people
Lithuanian atheists
Lithuanian communists
Lithuanian journalists
Male journalists
People from Wilno Voivodeship (1926–1939)
People from Ignalina
Communist Party of Lithuania politicians
Democratic Labour Party of Lithuania politicians
Social Democratic Party of Lithuania politicians
Speakers of the Seimas
Vilnius University alumni

Grand Crosses of the Order of Vytautas the Great
Recipients of the Order of the Cross of Terra Mariana, 2nd Class
21st-century Lithuanian politicians
Recipients of the Order of Prince Yaroslav the Wise, 3rd class